Titanium is a very advanced backdoor malware APT, developed by PLATINUM, a cybercrime collective. The malware was uncovered by Kaspersky Lab and reported on 8 November 2019. According to Global Security Mag, "Titanium APT includes a complex sequence of dropping, downloading and installing stages, with deployment of a Trojan-backdoor at the final stage." Much of the sequence is hidden from detection in a sophisticated manner, including hiding data steganographically in a PNG image. In their announcement report, Kaspersky Lab concluded: "The Titanium APT has a very complicated infiltration scheme. It involves numerous steps and requires good coordination between all of them. In addition, none of the files in the file system can be detected as malicious due to the use of encryption and fileless technologies. One other feature that makes detection harder is the mimicking of well-known software. Regarding campaign activity, we have not detected any current activity [as of 8 November 2019] related to the Titanium APT."

See also
 Serial over LAN
 Timeline of notable computer viruses and worms

References

External links
 Kaspersky Lab

Common trojan horse payloads
Cybercrime
Hacking in the 2010s
2019 in computing